The National Gallery of Kosovo (NGK), formerly known as the Kosova National Art Gallery (KNAG), is an art gallery situated at The University of Pristina Campus (6), right behind the National Library of Kosovo in Pristina, Kosovo, founded in February 1979.

It is the highest institution of visual arts in the Republic of Kosovo. It is the display space of various exhibitions of local and international artists. The most successful yearly exhibitions are the International Exhibition of Photography "Gjon Mili", the "Young Artist Award", "Artists of Tomorrow Prize" and "Muslim Mulliqi" International Contemporary Art Exhibition.

The Kosovo National Gallery has published books, catalogues, brochures and two monographs: "Kosova Contemporary Art" and "Kosova Feniks".

History

Early usage
The Kosova National Art Gallery was built approximately in 1935 as a military barrack of the Yugoslavian Army, made of stone bricks.
In the years 1955–1981 it operated as a library.
In the years 1982–1983 it was adapted into an exhibition hall by the architect Agush Beqiri, for the Revolutionary Museum of the time.
In 1995 it was officially adapted into what is now The Kosova National Art Gallery.

Foundation
The Kosova National Art Gallery was established in 1979 as a cultural institution to present visual arts, and to preserve and collect valuable works of art. It is named after one of the most prominent Kosovar artists, Muslim Mulliqi. The Gallery was established as a necessity for the visual presentation of Kosovar culture, as the only art institutions before it were the Art High School in Pejë in 1949, the Higher Pedagogical School in Pristina, and the Academy of Arts, founded in 1973, from which more than 1000 artists have graduated. Nearly 500 of them are active these days in the fields of painting, sculpture, graphic and applicative arts.

Kosovar art was unknown to the international public for a very long time. Because of the regime then, many artists were unable to display their art in art galleries, and so were always on the lookout for alternatives, and even resorted to taking matters into their own hands. Unfortunately, during the Kosovo War, many studios were burned down and many artworks were destroyed or lost.

Until 1990, Kosovar artists presented their art in many prestigious worldwide renowned centers. They were affirmed and evaluated highly because of their unique approach to the arts considering the circumstances in which they were created, making them distinguished and original.

During the ten after-war years, the Kosovo Art Gallery organized more than 200 collective and individual exhibitions from national as well as international artists. Thousands of artists have exhibited their works, which were visited by hundreds of thousands of art lovers.

Architecture
The Kosova National Art Gallery's facade was made from stone from the area of Pejë, which made it stand out. The building where the gallery is currently situated was once the seat of the museum of the 1941–1945 war.

Muslim Mulliqi
Muslim Mulliqi was one of the first and most important impressionist and expressionist painters of Kosovo and Albania. He was born into a family of artists in Gjakova in 1934. He attended the Academy of Fine Arts in Belgrade, studying under the well-known Serbian artist Zora Petrović. He finished his postgraduate studies by the same professor in 1961.

Mulliqi was a professor at the Faculty of Arts in the University of Pristina. He acted as founder and vice-president of the Academy of Sciences of Kosovo. He died in Pristina in 1998.

Mulliqi exhibited his artwork in Kosovo, Poland, Hungary, Italy, Germany, Norway, Finland, India, Canada, and Egypt.

His artwork has been used on stamps by the Kosova Postal Service.

Cooperation
As a result of cooperation between the Ministry of Culture Youth and Sports of Pristina, which is charge of the Gallery, and international institutions, the Gallery has hosted numerous guests from Albania and other neighboring states.

Many Serbian, Montenegrin, and Turkish artists also contributed to the development of Kosovar visual art. Vlada Radović, Milorad-Musa Miketić, Veljko Radović, and Svetozar Kamenović are notable for enabling other creative generations through their pedagogical work. Also noteworthy are the sculptor Svertomir Arsić-Basara, graphic artist Zoran Jovanović, painters Hilmija Qatoviq, Fevzi Tufekci, and Zoran Karalaić, who also worked in the Arts University in Pristina.

The Kosova National Art Gallery has created cooperation between:
National Gallery of Art of Albania in Tirana
European Cultural Parliament,
International Committee of Museums and Collections of Modern and Contemporary Art (ICOM)
Pavilion of Venice Biennale
Kosova Embassy in Washington

Competitions

Artist of Tomorrow Award XI
This program was initiated by Wendy W. Luers, founder and director of Foundation for a Civil Society in the United States. This competition is organised in many places of South East Europe, where the ceremonies of the Award traditionally continue. The award in Kosova was first organized in 2002 from the Kosova National Art Gallery in cooperation with the American Embassy.

The winner of the exhibition is rewarded by a six-week residency at the highly acclaimed International Curatorial Studios Program in New York. The residency gives the winner the opportunity to build a professional network that will mark a significant change in his career.

Originally held in 1991 in Czechoslovakia, this competition started attracting attention from many other countries in Europe. It started in Kosovo in 2002, and is now held in more than ten countries.

This is the only competition of its kind, and gives the winners the chance to create contacts and relations with people who might be of great help to their careers.

Anyone under the age of 35 can apply. The winners are chosen by a panel of experts, and all finalists may exhibit their artwork at the KNAG. The prize is a six-week stay in an international studio in New York City as well as a curatorial program, and has been so for eleven years.

Past winners include:
2002 - Tahar Alemdar
2003 - Jakup Ferri
2005 - Kader Muzaqi
2006 - Fitore Isufi-Koja
2007 - Fatmir Mustafa-Carlo
2008 - Bekim Gllogu
2009 - Miranda Thaçi
2010 - Loreta Ukshini
2011 - Astrit Ismaili
2012 - Majlinda Hoxha
2013 - Artan Hajrullahu

Artan Hajrullahu was born in 1979 in Kosovo. He completed his bachelor's and master's degrees at the Faculty of Arts in Pristina, at the Department of Painting. His drawings are delicate and they create a poetic story where human relationships and house objects take an important role. Hajrullahu teaches painting at the Secondary School of Visual Arts in Gjilan.

Gjon Milli Prize Photography Exhibition
This biannual exhibition was first held in 2001, as an initiative of the Kosova National Art Gallery and the US Office of the time. Its primary idea was to organize a traditional exhibition as a photography competition which would gather new photographers. Anyone is eligible to enter, with the prize being 1000 Euros. This initiative resulted with the yearly exhibition which has been held since, and has gained a reputation as the most important photography competition not only in Kosovo, but throughout the whole Albanian nation.

The winners so far has been:

2001: Burim Myftiu
2004: Mumin Jashari
2008: Linda Vukaj
2010: Chehalis Hegner
2011: Berat Murina
2012: Jetmir Idrizi
2013: Genc Kadriu

Burim Myftiu is Albanian American Visual Artist. He has received numerous awards and recognitions, and his work is held by major institutions internationally.

Muslim Mulliqi Prize Exhibition
The Muslim Mulliqi Prize is the most significant exhibition for contemporary visual arts in Kosovo, held in honor of the pioneer of modern painting Muslim Mulliqi. This aims to be one of the most interesting contemporary art projects in Southern Europe. It has been held since 2002, biannually, and experienced some pauses because of a lack of financial means.

The aim KNAG has given to itself in the latest editions of the Muslim Mulliqi Prize is the provision of the current Albanian visual art. The competition has expanded, including other exhibition spaces such as at the Gallery of the Ministry of Culture and the Amphitheater of the Architecture University.

Each year there are three members of different expertise in the jury, who decide the best work. The prize is 3000 Euros for the best artwork based on criteria assigned each year.

2003 winners: Jakup Ferri, Lulzim Zeqiri; curator: Nafja Zgonik; jury: Gjelosh Gjokaj, Nadja Zgonik, Gëzim Qëndro
2004 winners: Dren Maliqi, Mario Rizzi; curator: Gëzim Qëndro; jury: Eqrem Basha, Joa Ljunberg, Anjali Sen
2005 winners: Alban Hajdinaj, Hyesin Alptekin; curator: Mehmet Behluli; jury: Nikola Dietrich, Sergio Boynik, Gëzim Qëndro
2006 winners: Nebih Muiqi, Ismet Jonuzi; curator: Mustafa Ferizi; jury: Suzana Varvarica Kuka, Agim Salihu, Basri çapriqi
2007 winners: Lumturi Blloshmi, Bekim Gllogu; curator: Suzana Varvarica Chukka; jury: Nadja Zgonik, Gjelosh Gjokai, Ali Podrimja
2008 winners: Jae Pas; curators: D.N.K./FILOART, Zeni Ballazhi; jury: the artists
2009 winners: Antigona Selmani, Loreta Ukshini, Malsore Bejta; curators: Gazmend Ejupi, Michele Robecchi; jury: Albert Heta, Zake Prevlukaj
2010 winners: curator: Fitore Isufi-Koja, Valbona Rexhepi 
2012 winners: Abedin Azizi; curator: Galit Eilat, Charles Esche
2014 curator: Corinne Diserens
2016 winner: Fani Zguro; curator: Artan Shabani
2018 winners: Artan Hajrullahu and Valdrin Thaçi; curator: Iara Boubnova

Disciplines and artists
Many great artists have merits in the development and affirmation of the visual art in Kosovo. With their exhibitions in many galleries around the world, such as Daut Berisha in Paris, the US, Mexico, Mikel Gjokaj in Rome, Brussels, Tirana, and Bahri Drançolli in Munchen, Germany, they have helped spread the knowledge of Kosovar art.

Artists whose work has been exhibited at the museum include Masar Caka, Tahir Emra, Gjelosh Gjokaj, Ibrahim Kodra, Nimon Lokaj, Muslim Mulliqi, Visar Mulliqi, Ramadan Ramadani, Esat Valla, Sislej Xhafa, Haki Xhakli, Hysni Krasniqi, Musë Prelvukaj, Agim Çavdarbasha and Burim Myftiu.

Transport connections

Exhibitions

Pre-Kosovo War period exhibitions
Source:

Kosovo post-war period exhibitions
Source:

Collection highlights

Facts about Pristina galleries
Personal Exhibitions: National Museum in Tirana (2006), Free Journey curated by Ismet Jonuzi, the National Gallery of Kosova (2010).
Group Exhibitions: Contemporary Art Exhibition at the National Museum in Tirana (2007), International Biennale of Drawing, Pristina (2010), Contemporary Art Center, Gjilan (2012).

See also
Culture of Kosovo
Culture in Pristina
Events and festivals in Pristina
Pristina International Airport Adem Jashari
National Theater of Kosovo
Ethnological Treasure of Kosovo
Archaeology of Kosovo
Timeline of Kosovo history

References

Notes

Bibliography
The Kosova National Art Gallery (2009), 30th anniversary of The Kosova National Art Gallery, Prishtina: The Kosova National Art Gallery
The Kosova National Art Gallery (2010), Collection, Prishtina: The Kosova National Art Gallery
The Kosova National Art Gallery (2010), Life and deed of Mother Teresa, Prishtina: The Kosova National Art Gallery
The Kosova National Art Gallery (2010), Victor Vasarely, Prishtina: The Kosova National Art Gallery
The Kosova National Art Gallery (2011), Artists of Tomorrow, Prishtina: The Kosova National Art Gallery

External links
Academy of Sciences and Arts of Kosovo
Cultural Heritage without Borders program: Kosovo
Kosovo Ministry of Culture, Youth, and Sport

1979 establishments in Kosovo
Art museums established in 1979
Art museums and galleries in Kosovo
National museums of Kosovo
Contemporary art galleries in Europe
Sculpture galleries
Landmarks in Kosovo
Museums in Pristina
Articles containing video clips
Cultural heritage of Kosovo